The Tour of Limburg is a European single day cycle race held in the Belgian region of Limburg. The race was first organised in 1919 and remained on the calendar until 1994, with the course typically in and around the city of Sint-Truiden. After 1994 it was no longer organised until it was reinstated in 2012 as a 1.2 event on the UCI Europe Tour, with the host city now Tongeren. Since 2014, the race has been categorised as a 1.1 race.

Winners

Notes

References

External links
  

Cycle races in Belgium
UCI Europe Tour races
Recurring sporting events established in 1919
1919 establishments in Belgium
Sport in Sint-Truiden
Sport in Tongeren
Sport in Limburg (Belgium)